The History of Flo & Eddie and the Turtles was a three-LP box set album from Flo & Eddie, issued in 1983 by Rhino Records. The first LP included a song recorded by an early incarnation of The Turtles under the name The Crossfires, a selection of rarities by The Turtles themselves, including a BBC session recording of their signature song "Happy Together", and songs from their first post-Turtles album, The Phlorescent Leech & Eddie, from 1972. The second LP contained songs from their next 3 albums: Flo & Eddie (1973), Illegal, Immoral and Fattening (1975), and Moving Targets (1976). The final LP in the set featured songs recorded for film and TV soundtracks, linked with excerpts from The Flo & Eddie Radio Show. This box set has never been reissued on CD.

This was the first album in which Flo & Eddie had been legally allowed to use the name The Turtles since leaving White Whale Records, owners of the name, in 1970. Instead of duplicating tracks already available on the Turtles' first five studio albums, which had been reissued by Rhino the same year, the portion of the compilation dedicated to The Turtles contains otherwise out-of-print and unreleased material.

Track listing 

 CHAPTER ONE
The Westchester High School A Capella Choir Class 1963 - "Alma Mater"
The Crossfires - "Silver Bullet"
The Turtles - "I Get Out of Breath"
The Turtles - "Outside Chance"
The Turtles - "Grim Reaper of Love"
The "Real" Don Steel - "Battle of the Bands Album Commercial"
The Turtles - "Lady-O"
The Turtles - "It Ain't Me Babe/You Baby/She'd Rather Be with Me/Elenore (Medley)"

CHAPTER TWO
The Turtles - "Happy Together" (live)
The Turtles - "Goodbye Surprise"
The Turtles - "There You Sit Lonely"
The Turtles - "We Ain't Gonna Party No More"
Flo & Eddie - "The Flo & Eddie Theme"
Flo & Eddie - "Feel Older Now"
Flo & Eddie - "Nikki Hoi"
Flo & Eddie - "I've Been Born Again"

CHAPTER THREE
- Flo & Eddie -
"Best Part of Breaking up"
"Another's Pop Star Life"
"Just Another Town"
"Afterglow"
"You're a Lady"
"Marmendy Mill"

CHAPTER FOUR
- Flo & Eddie -
"Illegal, Immoral and Fattening "
"Rebecca"
"Let Me Make Love to You"
"Mama, Open Up"
"Keep it Warm"
"Moving Targets"

CHAPTER FIVE
- The Flo & Eddie Radio Show - (All Songs previously unreleased)
"Flo & Eddie by the Fireside Radio Theme"
"The Big Showdown" (from the movie Texas Detour)
"This Could be the Day" (from the movie The Dirty Duck)
"(You're Nothing but a) Good Duck" (from the movie The Dirty Duck)

CHAPTER SIX
- The Flo & Eddie Radio Show - (All Songs previously unreleased)
"The Flo & Eddie Show"
"Getaway (Back to L.A.)" (from the movie Texas Detour)
"Livin' in a Jungle" (from the movie The Dirty Duck)
"Youth in Asia"
"Medley #2"

Special Guest appeared on the RADIO SHOW:
David Bowie
Keith Moon
Ringo Starr
Alice Cooper
Marc Bolan
Lou Reed
Harry Nilsson
Jeff Lynne
Roy Wood

References

Flo & Eddie albums
The Turtles albums
1983 compilation albums
Rhino Records compilation albums